Legislative elections were held in South Korea on 8 June 1967. The result was a victory for the Democratic Republican Party, which won 129 of the 175 seats in the National Assembly. Voter turnout was 76.1%.

Results

Results by city/province

Notes

References

Legislative elections in South Korea
South Korea
Legislative